Hezekiah Ezekial Braxton, III (April 11, 1934 – August 9, 2013) was a professional American football player who played running back for two seasons for the San Diego Chargers and Buffalo Bills.

References

1936 births
2013 deaths
American football running backs
Buffalo Bills players
San Diego Chargers players
Virginia Union Panthers football players
Players of American football from Baltimore
American Football League players